Paul William Kroeger (1907-1977) was Oklahoma's second poet laureate, appointed in 1931 by Governor William H. Murray. Though his work appeared in periodicals and anthologies, Kroeger never published a volume of poems, and his work is rarely read today.

See also 

 Poets Laureate of Oklahoma

References

1907 births
1977 deaths
Poets Laureate of Oklahoma
Place of birth missing
Place of death missing
20th-century American poets